A Killing Affair (also known as Behind the Badge) is a 1977 American made-for-television crime drama film starring Elizabeth Montgomery and O. J. Simpson. The film originally aired on CBS on September 21, 1977.

Plot
Elizabeth Montgomery and O. J. Simpson star as homicide detectives pursuing a killer played by Dean Stockwell. While working on the case, the partners begin having a heated romantic affair.

Cast

Reception
A Killing Affair received generally positive reviews, with particular praise for O. J. Simpson. People called it Simpson's "best dramatic performance to date." John J. O'Connor of the New York Times wrote,

A Killing Affair received a 29% Nielsen rating, finishing second to Charlie's Angels in its time slot.

There was relatively little controversy generated by the interracial romance between the protagonists. Montgomery and Simpson did not receive any significant hate mail, though one Southern CBS affiliate did receive a bomb threat after the film aired.

References

External links
 

1977 television films
1977 films
American crime films
CBS network films
Films about interracial romance
Films directed by Richard C. Sarafian
1970s American films